Attract may refer to:

 Physical attractiveness, personal features considered aesthetically pleasing or beautiful
 Interpersonal attraction, a part of social psychology
 Attract mode, in video gaming

See also
 
 
 Attraction (disambiguation)
 Attractor (disambiguation)
 Attracted sequence of tenses, in grammar
 "Opposites Attract", a song by Paula Abdul